Events in the year 1916 in Norway.

Incumbents
Monarch – Haakon VII

Events

 Municipal and county elections are held throughout the country.

Popular culture

Sports

Music

Film

Literature
 The Olav Duun novel  (Good Conscience) was published.

Notable births
7 January – Gunnar Jakobsen, politician (died 1992)
15 January – Sigrid Utkilen, politician (died 2006)
24 January – Erik Heiberg, sailor and Olympic silver medallist (died 1996)
14 February – Reidar Kvaal, military officer (died 2016)
15 February – Thorleif Kristensen, politician (died 1997)
16 February – Torgeir Andersen, politician (died 1991)
1 March – Arvid Hansen, resistance member, executed (died 1945)
17 March – Hans Hjelle, politician (died 2008)
20 March – Magnus Andersen, politician and minister (died 1994)
28 March – Charles Oluf Herlofson, naval officer (died 1984)
8 April – Victor Borg, physician, novelist, playwright and script writer (died 1996).
12 April – Finn Lied, military researcher, politician and minister (died 2014)
29 April – Lars Korvald, politician and Prime Minister of Norway (died 2006)
4 May – Ole Borge, jurist and resistance member (died 1995)
7 May – Eigil Olaf Liane, politician (died 1994)
5 June – Torstein Eckhoff, civil servant and professor of law (died 1993)
5 June – Jan Iversen, politician (died 1999)
13 June – Dagfinn Mannsåker, archivist and historian (died 1994)
14 June – Odd Starheim, resistance fighter and SOE agent (died 1943)
20 June – Reidar Alveberg, bobsledder (died 2004)
22 June – Bjarne Kjørberg, politician (died 1969)
29 June – Thor Fossum, politician (died 1993)
17 August – Eivind Skabo, sprint canoer and Olympic bronze medallist (died 2006)
22 August – Ole Bergesen, politician (died 1965)
24 August – Sigmund P. Haave, politician (died 2001)
30 August – Oskar Edøy, politician (died 2008)
12 September – Rolf Andersen, politician (died 1990)
18 September – Thomas Byberg, speed skater and Olympic silver medallist (died 1998)
24 September – Olav Gjærevoll, botanist, politician and minister (died 1994)
10 October – Kåre Holt, author (died 1997)
21 October – Ottar Grønvik, philologist and runology scholar (died 2008)
15 November – Greta Gynt, singer, dancer and actress (died 2000)
9 December – Claus Egil Feyling, politician (died 1989)

Full date unknown
Trygve Bjørgo, educator and poet (died 1997)
Knut Blom, judge (died 1996)
Bjørvik Jacobsen, trapper/hunter and author (d. c2000)
Tor Jonsson, author and journalist (died 1951)
Sivert Andreas Nielsen, civil servant, banker and politician (died 2004)

Notable deaths

10 April – Ole Bornemann Bull, ophthalmologist (born 1842)
12 September – Henrik Mohn, meteorologist (born 1835)
1 October – Carl Otto Løvenskiold, naval officer, politician and land owner (born 1839).

Full date unknown
Nils Henrik Bruun, engineer (born 1832)
Endre Johannes Cleven, settler in Canada (born 1874)
Ole Herman Johannes Krag, gun designer (born 1837)
Yngvar Nielsen, historian and geographer (born 1843)
Erik V. Vullum, politician and author (born 1850)

See also

References

External links

Norway
Norway